Fortune's Mask is a 1922 American drama film starring Earle Williams and featuring Oliver Hardy. It is unknown whether any print of the film survives; it may be a lost film.

Plot

Cast
 Earle Williams as Ramón Olivarra (aka Dicky Maloney)
 Patsy Ruth Miller as Pasa Ortiz
 Henry Hebert as Losada
 Milton Ross as General Pilar
 Eugenie Forde as Madame Ortiz
 Arthur Tavares as Vicenti
 Frank Whitson as Espiración
 Oliver Hardy as Chief of Police
 William McCall as Captain Cronin

See also
 List of American films of 1922
 Oliver Hardy filmography

References

External links

1922 films
1922 drama films
American black-and-white films
1922 short films
American silent short films
Silent American drama films
1920s American films